Richard Solem (June 21, 1926 – August 6, 2007) was an American speed skater. He competed in two events at the 1948 Winter Olympics.

References

External links
 

1926 births
2007 deaths
American male speed skaters
Olympic speed skaters of the United States
Speed skaters at the 1948 Winter Olympics
Speed skaters from Chicago